Silent Treatment – the second studio album by Polish trip hop singer Pati Yang. The album was released by EMI Music Poland on 1 October 2005.

The album was nominated for the Fryderyk awards 2005 in category "Album of the Year - Pop".

Track listing

References 

Pati Yang albums
2005 albums